Epalpus is a genus of flies in the family Tachinidae.

Species
E. albomaculatus (Jaennicke, 1867)
E. rufipennis (Macquart, 1846)
E. rufipes (Brooks, 1949)
E. signifer (Walker, 1849)

References

Tachininae
Tachinidae genera
Taxa named by Camillo Rondani